Warren Carr (c.1929 - 1993) was an Australian singer, composer, producer and musician, specializing in country and rock 'n' roll, although his music was better described as Honky Tonk piano party style. He is best known for his 20-year involvement as in-house pianist in the ABC children's TV show, Play School.

Biography
The Newcastle, New South Wales-born Carr started his career at a young age, and 1960 featured in John Konrads Kaydets. He recorded numerous covers including songs by Floyd Cramer. In the 1960s, he performed with a number of Australian rock artists, including Johnny O'Keefe, Warren Williams and Jimmy Little. He produced a number of his own albums for Leedon Records.  His single Li'l Ole Me reached number 9 in the Sydney charts, he also appeared on O' Keefe's Six O'Clock Rock music program.

Warren was the pianist on ABCs Play School from the years of 1972 to 1993.  His primary role was off camera playing the piano to accompany the other presenters' songs, but he was occasionally featured on camera, and also took part in presenting some non musical parts of the show. From 1963 to 1993, Warren served as musical director at Sydney's, St George Leagues club

Personal life
Carr died in 1993 of heart disease,  He has two sons, Darren and Michael. His son is Michael Carr, an ARIA Award winning performer known as Buddy Goode, a country musician, songwriter and entertainer, who won the 2012 & 2014 Aria Award for Best Comedy Album. His son Darren Carr is ventriloquist and a multi MO Award-winning Entertainer of the Year.

Discography

Albums

References

1993 deaths
Australian children's entertainers
Date of birth unknown
Year of birth uncertain
Date of death missing
Place of death missing
Australian pianists
Australian music arrangers
Australian songwriters
People from Newcastle, New South Wales
20th-century Australian pianists
20th-century Australian musicians